The Ministry of Economy of Azerbaijan Republic is the central executive body responsible for implementing state policy and regulation in the following areas: formulating economic policy of Azerbaijan, producing macroeconomic projections, creating a favorable environment for economic development and growth, encouraging investment activity, developing entrepreneurship and industry, regulating the licensing and permit system, protecting, developing and encouraging competition, protecting the rights of consumers, implementing state procurement policy, ensuring full and timely introduction of taxes and other mandatory payments relating to the authority of the Ministry, in the state budget, management of government assets, privatization, establishing state land management system, conducting state registration and  single state cadastre of immovable property.

History
In 1918–1920, the first Ministry of Commerce and Industry of independent Azerbaijan carried out its functions within  the government of Azerbaijan Democratic Republic.

In the Soviet Socialist Republic of Azerbaijan, which was a part of the USSR in 1920–1991, economic issues were regulated by such committees as the Ministry of Commerce, Industry and Food, the Ministry of Trade and Industry, and the State Planning Committee of the USSR.

April 30, 2001 - State Property Ministry, Ministry of Economy, Ministry of Trade, State Committee for Antimonopoly Policy and Support of Entrepreneurship and Foreign Investments Agency were abolished and the Ministry of Economic Development was established on the basis of these bodies according to the Decree of the President of Azerbaijan Republic.

October 22, 2013 - The Ministry of Economy and Industry was established on the basis of the Ministry of Economic Development in accordance with the Order of the President of Azerbaijan Republic.

January 15, 2016 - The Ministry of Economy of Azerbaijan was established on the basis of the Ministry of Economy and Industry in accordance with the Order of the President of Republic.

October 23, 2019 – New structure of the Ministry was approved by Decree of the President of Azerbaijan.

Activities of the Ministry 
According to Regulations on the Ministry of Economy of Azerbaijan, the ministry carries out following activities:

 Participate in preparation and implementation of strategy on social and economic development of the country;
 Make proposals to create favourable environment generating sustainable and inclusive economic development and sustained economy growth;
 In accordance with priorities of country's economic development, participate in formulating state policy in following areas: state economy governance; finance, including justification of incomes and expenses of state and consolidated budgets; taxes system, monetary and currency policies, banking and insurance sectors, stock market, tariff and price policies, prevention of money laundering and terrorism financing; 
 Develop, coordinate and supervise (monitor) implementation of concepts and state programmes on social and economic development, along with corresponding state bodies and organs; 
 Make assessment of social and economic development processes in the country, social and economic (macroeconomic) projections; 
 Along with corresponding state organs, ensure economic security of the state and protection of state interests, as well as develop and implement activities to support sustained economic growth;
 Carry out activities aimed at increasing transparency in economy and improving business environment in the country;  
 Carry out activities to stimulate and diversify national economy and export; 
 Along with corresponding state organs, ensure development and implementation of state policy in manufacturing industry; 
 Along with corresponding state organs, ensure development and implementation of state policy in attracting, protecting and stimulating investments in national economy; 
 Participate in formulation of state policy in developing and stimulating entrepreneurship,  providing state support to entrepreneurship, as well as in regulating the licensing and permit system, and ensure policy's implementation along with corresponding state organs;
 Participate in preparation and implementation of long-term programme aimed at country's sustainable economic growth through deliberate development of human capital; 
 Participate in formulation of state policy in protecting, developing and stimulating free competition in the country, including prevention of antimonopoly activity and elimination of unfair competition cases; 
 Participate along with corresponding state organs in elaboration and implementation of state policy on development and regulation of  foreign economic relations and international trade activities; 
 Participate along with corresponding state organs in formulation and implementation of state policy in social and economic development of regions;
 Ensure full and timely introduction of taxes and other mandatory payments which are assigned by the legislation and the President of Azerbaijan Republic to the Ministry, in the state budget; 
 Participate in formation and ensure implementation of state policy in management of state assets, as well as prepare proposals on improvement of the structure of state property; 
 Participate in formation and ensure implementation of state policy in privatization and management of the state property, including state housing stock and lands, as well as carry out state registration and  single state cadastre of immovable property; 
 Participate along with corresponding state organs in formulation and implementation of state policy to protect consumer rights and provide the quality of products (works, services);  
 Participate along with corresponding state organs in formulation and implementation of state policy in procurement of products (works, services) financed by the state;
 Carry out state control of advertising activity (except for open space advertising); 
 Participate along with corresponding state organs in formulation and implementation of state policy in the fields of standardization, metrology, evaluation of compatibility, accreditation, and quality management; 
 Carry out activity in creating standards in suitable areas.

Activity of Ministry of Economy 
November 20, 2019 – Azerbaijan's Minister of Economy Mikayil Jabbarov was elected as Chairman of the Coordination Council of Heads of Tax Services of the CIS Member States.

December 6, 2019 – the International Conference dedicated to the 20th Anniversary of signing the Basic Multilateral Agreement on International Transport for Development of the Europe-the Caucasus-Asia Corridor and the Fourteenth Annual Meeting of the Intergovernmental Commission (IGC) TRACECA was held in Baku.

December 6, 2019 – The Republic of Azerbaijan officially assumed the chairmanship in the Intergovernmental Commission TRACECA.

December 9, 2019 – The Republic of Azerbaijan and the Russian Federation signed a Protocol of Intent on Economic Cooperation.

April 8, 2020 – The program to compensate entrepreneurs and their employees for the damage caused by the coronavirus (COVID-19) pandemic was launched in accordance with  the Action Plan adopted by the Cabinet of Ministers in order to reduce the negative impact on business entities due to the coronavirus pandemic 

May 4, 2020 – The Ministry of Economy launched a new mechanism on partial refund of VAT paid for goods by individual consumers 

October 15, 2020 - Financial sanctions against small and micro business entities from areas fully and partially occupied, as well as front-line territories, were lifted 

May 29, 2021 – President Ilham Aliyev inaugurated a new building of the Ministry of Economy.

Structure

Organizations under the auspices of Ministry of Economy 

 State Tax Service
 State Service on Property Issues
 State Service for Antimonopoly Policy and Consumer Market Control
 Agency for Development of Economic Zones
 Entrepreneurship Development Fund
 The Small and Medium Business Development Agency
 Baku Business Center
 Institute for Scientific Research on Economic Reforms
 “Consumer Goods Expertise Center” LLC
 Center for Analysis and Coordination of the Fourth Industrial Revolution

Bodies founded by the Ministry of Economy 

 Azerbaijan Export and Investment Promotion Agency (AZPROMO) 
 “Azerbaijan Investment Company” OJSC 
 “Tamiz Shahar” OJSC 
 “AzerGold” OJSC 
 “Azerkhalcha” OJSC

The State Program on Economic development 

 State Program on the socio-economic development of regions of Azerbaijan Republic in 2019-2023  
 State Program on the socio-economic development of regions of Azerbaijan Republic in 2014-2018 
 State Program on socio-economic development of Baku city and its settlements in 2014–2016 years 
 State Program on socio-economic development of Baku city and its settlements in 2011–2013 years 
 State Program on socio-economic development of regions of the Republic of Azerbaijan for 2009–2013 years 
 State Program on Poverty Reduction and Sustainable Development (SPPRSD) in the Republic of Azerbaijan for 2008-2015 
 State Program on the reliable food supply of population in the Azerbaijan Republic in 2008-2015 
 State Program for the development of industry in Azerbaijan in 2015-2020

Responsibilities 
The responsibilities of ministry include:

 Defining certain strategies that show exact paths and directions leads the social and economic development of the country, preparing economic programs and monitoring their implementation;
 Taking into account the relevant analysis of the economic circumstances of the country and providing appropriate methods in order to regulate the social and economic activities;
 Maintaining the links between central and local executive authorities for realizing economic reforms;
 For the purpose of establishing economic cooperation with international and regional financial organizations including taking certain measures in order to develop more efficient foreign economic relations according to the state policy in this field;
 Checking the implementation of state policy on trade;
 Controlling structural and investment policy in the Republic of Azerbaijan is carried out accordingly;
 Determining the ways that regional economic policy is implemented;
 Monitoring the implementations of directions that designed to promote the development of entrepreneurship;
 Ensuring the state policy in privatization and controlling of state property, implementing disposal of state property;
 Restraining and eliminating monopolies and ensuring fair competition among economic bodies, carrying out of measures determined by legislation that aimed to guarantee consumer protection;
 Implementation of other responsibilities according to the legislation of the Republic of Azerbaijan.

Achievements 
The following goals have been achieved by the Ministry during its functioning period:

 Strengthened the fight against artificial price increases;
 Created a “hot line” for grain producers;
 Produced a catalog "Made in Azerbaijan", covering 10 areas of industry;
 Prepared proposals for the restoration of the affected areas of Azerbaijan from the occupation of Armenia;
 Started issuing licenses in electronic form;
 It has supported entrepreneurship, investment in the real sector and the preservation of a stable manat rate.

Azerbaijan in International Reports 
According to “The Global Competitiveness Report 2017-2018”, issued by the World Economic Forum, Azerbaijan improved its competitiveness by 2 points and ranked 35th among 137 countries, while saved 1st place among CIS countries since 2009. As a result, our country moveв forward by 34 points in the global competitiveness level from 69th place among 117 economies in 2005 to 35th among 137 economies in 2017. Azerbaijan left behind some G-20 country-members: Indonesia (36th place), the Russian Federation (38th), India (40th), Italy (43rd), Mexico (51st), Turkey (53rd), South Africa (61st), Brazil (80th), and Argentina (92nd). According to the global competition index, Azerbaijan had the most competitive economy in the region and maintained leading position among neighboring countries.

“The Global Competitiveness Report-2019” highlighted Azerbaijan as the country with the highest level of social equality in the world. Azerbaijan climbed to the top in the world with getting a maximum of points. According to the report, Azerbaijan ranked 31st among 140 countries in the world.

“Doing Business 2019” report, published by the World Bank and the International Financial Corporation, included Azerbaijan to the list of top-10 reformers, which were selected based on the number of reforms and on how much their ease of doing business score improved. According to the report, Azerbaijan improved its position by 32 points since 2017 and reached 25th place among 190 countries left behind many countries in the world behind and took a leading position among the CIS countries.

List of Ministers of Economy 

Farhad Aliyev, April 30, 2001 - October 19, 2005 
Heydar Babayev, October 19, 2005 - October 31, 2008
Shahin Mustafayev, October 31, 2008 - October 23, 2019 
Mikayil Jabbarov, October 23, 2019 - incumbent

See also
Cabinet of Azerbaijan
Economy of Azerbaijan
Economic development in Azerbaijan

References

Economy of Azerbaijan
Azerbaijan
Economic Development